Spokesperson of the Government of Iran is responsible for gathering and disseminating information regarding the Cabinet to the media. The position was last held by Mohammad Bagher Nobakht. and was vacant for 10 months, until appointment of Ali Rabii in May 2019.

Spokespersons

Before 1979 revolution

After 1979 revolution 
As follows:

See also 
 Spokesperson for the Ministry of Foreign Affairs of Iran

References 

Iranian spokespersons